Salem Hanna Khamis (November 22, 1919 – June 16, 2005) was a Palestinian economic statistician for the United Nations Food and Agriculture Organization who helped formalise the Geary-Khamis method of computing purchasing power parity of currencies.

Education and early career
Son of Hanna and Jamileh a Christian Palestinian family, Salem Khamis was born on November 22, 1919, in Reineh village,  Palestine. He finished high school in 1938 with distinction at the Arab College in Jerusalem. He received a British Mandate scholarship for studying at the American University of Beirut (AUB), where he received in 1941 a BA degree in Mathematics (major) and Physics (minor), and in 1942 an MA in Physics.

From 1942-1943, Salem taught at the Akka High School in Acre and St Lucas High School in Haifa. In 1943 he was appointed a lecturer in the Mathematics Department at AUB. In 1945 he received a British Council scholarship for a PhD at University College London. He defended his thesis during the 1948 Arab-Israeli War and Palestinian exodus (Nakba), and received the PhD title in 1950.

Khamis became known for his political activities among student communities, especially his advocacy for dispossessed Palestinian people. In 1948 he was refused entrance to the new State of Israel, in whose territory Reineh now lay. Instead, he moved to Aleppo, Syria, where he lectured Applied Mathematics in the Engineering College of Syria University (now University of Damascus), and was appointed head of the Mathematics department.

United Nations
In 1949 he married Mary Guy and they had four children: Thea, Hanna, Christopher and Tareq. He soon accepted an invitation from the United Nations to work in its Statistical Office in Lake Success (1949-1950) then New York (1950-1953). In addition to his position in the United Nations, he became part-time visiting lecturer in the Mathematical Statistics Department at Columbia University.

Salem finally visited his home in Israel in 1952. In 1953 he returned to AUB as Associate Professor of Economics. Between 1955 and 1958 he was appointed Professor and Chairman of Mathematics Department. Between 1958 and 1963 he became United Nations Food and Agriculture Organization Regional Statistician for the Near East (duty stations: Cairo, United Arab Republic 1958-1960, and Rome, Italy 1960-1963).

Between 1961 and 1970 Salem became Chief of the FAO Trade Prices Branch in Rome. Between 1970 and 1972 he was Director and UN Project Manager at the Institute of Statistics and Applied Economics, Makerere University, Kampala, Uganda. In 1972 he returned to Rome to become Head of the FAO Methodology Group – Statistical Development Service until 1974, and Chief of the Service 1975-1981. Work consisted mainly in assisting developing countries in the improvement of their food and agricultural statistics through national, regional and international statistical projects.

In parallel (1976-1978), he acted in Baghdad as UN Project Manager/Chief Advisor to the Arab Institute for Training and Research in Statistics.

In 1981 Salem resigned from his position at FAO and moved to England where his children lived. However, he continued to work as an expert and as the head of several scientific missions by the UN, and provided consulted at many countries, such as:

1981-1987: Statistics Advisor, Arab Fund for Social Economic Development, Kuwait
1982: Evaluation and development of the statistical activities of the Palestine Liberation Organization (PLO)
1986: Jordan Government Consultant, Rural Research Centre, An-Najah National University, Nablus, West Bank
Statistics Advisor for Sri Lanka, Libya, Sudan and others

Salem Khamis died on June 16, 2005, at his residence in Hemel Hempstead, England

Scientific Contributions
Prof. Khamis contributed tens of scientific research papers in Statistics and Mathematics. Specifically, he contributed to Sampling theory and the tabulation of the Incomplete gamma function, where he wrote the book “Tables of the Incomplete Gamma Function Ratio”.

He contributed in the field of Index Number Theory through a series of papers starting 1972. He developed what became known as, and “indelibly imprinted on all the recent work on international comparisons of prices, real incomes, output and productivity” (Rao, 2005), the Geary-Khamis Method of Computing Purchase Power Parity of Currencies and the Geary-Khamis dollar used to compare different economies.

In addition to his professional work as an international statistician, Prof. Khamis helped many students from Arab countries and many other nationalities to receive scholarships, supporting many students in developing their careers.
He was also known for his strong support for all the underprivileged in the world, and for his continuous support of the Palestinian refugee camps and the Palestinian cause.

References

Sources
CV by Salem Hanna Khamis
Interviews with the family of the Salem Khamis

1919 births
2005 deaths
People from Reineh
Palestinian mathematicians
Palestinian Christians
Palestinian activists
British officials of the United Nations
Food and Agriculture Organization officials
Palestinian economists
American University of Beirut alumni
Alumni of University College London
Palestinian officials of the United Nations